The 1982–83 Scottish League Cup was the thirty-seventh season of Scotland's second football knockout competition. The competition was won by Celtic, who defeated Rangers in the Final.

First round

Group 1

Group 2

Group 3

Group 4

Group 5

Group 6

Group 7

Group 8

Group 9

Play-off

Supplementary Round

First Leg

Second Leg

Quarter-finals

First Leg

Second Leg

Semi-finals

First Leg

Second Leg

Final

References

General

Specific

1982–83 in Scottish football
Scottish League Cup seasons